The Hellenic Futsal Super League is the premier futsal league in Greece, organized by Hellenic Football Federation. The most successful club is Athina 90 that has won 13 Championships. A.C. Doukas School are the current champions, having won 4 titles.

2019–20 season teams
AEK
Doukas
Olympiada Agia Paraskevi
Minotavros
Kallithea Futsal
Salamina
Ermis Zografou
Neo Ikonio
Proteas Pas
Panathinaikos
Elite Athens Club

Champions by year

Performance by club

References

External links
  UEFA Greek futsal championship
 futsalplanet.com
 futsalhellas.gr
 5x5hellas.gr
futsal365.gr 

Futsal competitions in Greece
futsal
Greece
1997 establishments in Greece
Sports leagues established in 1997